The 2013 Australia national rugby union team tour of Great Britain, Ireland and Italy was a rugby union tour between the away team Australia and the homes teams of England, Ireland, Italy, Scotland and Wales. They also played an additional Test match against New Zealand, which acted as the third and final Bledisloe Cup match for 2013.

As part of the tour, they attempted their first Grand Slam tour of the Home Nations since 2009 following their 2–1 defeat to the British & Irish Lions in June 2013. However, their first Grand Slam victory since 1984 was not possible, following their 20–13 defeat to England in the opening week of their tour, which also meant they were unable to retain the Cook Cup.

The Wallabies became the first team to score 33 points against New Zealand in New Zealand during the third Bledisloe Cup match, and were also able to retain the Lansdowne Cup against Ireland. They also reclaimed back the Hopetoun Cup for the first time since 2006, after losing it in 2009 and unable to reclaim it in 2012. Australia also won the James Bevan Trophy for the eighth time and for the sixth time in a row in the closing match of their tour.

Schedule

Matches

New Zealand

Notes:
 Australia became the first team to score 33 points against New Zealand in New Zealand.
 Will Genia became just the third Australian scrum-half and the 39th Wallaby player to reach 50 test caps.
 Peter Betham made his international debut for Australia.

England

Notes:
 England reclaim the Cook Cup.
 Joel Tomkins made his international debut for England.

Italy

Notes:
 Luke McLean earned his 50th cap for Italy.
 Tommaso Allan made his international debut for Italy and scored his first test try.

Ireland

Notes:
 Australia retain the Lansdowne Cup.

Scotland

Notes:
 Kieran Low made his international debut for Scotland.
 Jim Hamilton earned his 50th test cap for Scotland.
 Australia reclaimed the Hopetoun Cup for the first time since 2006 after losing it in 2009 and having been unable to reclaim it in 2012.

Wales

Notes:
 Quade Cooper earned his 50th test cap for Australia.
 Australia won the James Bevan Trophy for the eighth time and for the sixth time in a row.
Israel Folau scored his 10th international try of the year in this match, equalling the Australian record set by Lote Tuqiri in 2002.

Squad
Head Coach Ewen McKenzie named a 32-man squad on 11 October 2013.

On 15 October, Peter Betham was added to the squad for the Bledisloe Cup match on 19 October to cover the injured Chris Feauai-Sautia and Joe Tomane, who were ruled out of that test – Betham will not tour Europe. On 20 November, Peter Betham was re-added to the squad following the 5-week ban Tevita Kuridrani received after he was red carded against Ireland.

Note: Caps and date of ages are to opening tour match on 19 October 2013.

Coach staff
Head Coach – Ewen McKenzie

Attack Coach – Jim McKay

Defense Coach – Nick Scrivener

Set-piece Coach – Andrew Blades

Player statistics
Key
Con: Conversions
Pen: Penalties
DG: Drop goals
Pts: Points

Team statistics
 Scored 179 Points
 Conceded 137 Points
 Scores 20 tries (17 converted)
 Conceded 11 tries
 Conceded 61 penalties

See also
 2013 end-of-year rugby union tests

References

2013
2013
2013
2013
2013
2013
2013 rugby union tours
2013–14 in European rugby union
2013 in Australian rugby union
2013–14 in English rugby union
2013–14 in Irish rugby union
2013–14 in Italian rugby union
2013–14 in Scottish rugby union
2013–14 in Welsh rugby union